Yngvar Håkonsen (born 29 January 1978) is a Norwegian footballer playing for Fløy.

Håkonsen has previously played for Tromsø, Lyn, Start and Kongsvinger in Tippeligaen. He has also played for the Belgian club Gent.

References

1978 births
Living people
Norwegian footballers
Eliteserien players
Belgian Pro League players
Tromsø IL players
IK Start players
Lyn Fotball players
K.A.A. Gent players
Kongsvinger IL Toppfotball players
Expatriate footballers in Belgium
Norwegian expatriate footballers
Association football defenders
Sportspeople from Kristiansand